Leung Hing Kit (born 22 October 1989) is a Hong Kong professional footballer who currently plays for Hong Kong Premier League club Rangers.

Club career
On 11 June 2017, Pegasus chairperson Canny Leung revealed that Leung along with three other South China players would be jumping ship to Pegasus and he became the captain of the team in 2021 season. In April 2021, he was awarded Hong Kong Premier League Player of the Month.

On 16 July 2021, Leung joined Rangers.

Career statistics

Club

International

Hong Kong U-23
As of 3 June 2011

Hong Kong
As of 18 November 2010

References

External links
 
 

1989 births
Living people
Hong Kong footballers
Hong Kong international footballers
Association football goalkeepers
Fourway Athletics players
Hong Kong First Division League players
Hong Kong Premier League players
South China AA players
Hong Kong Rangers FC players
TSW Pegasus FC players
Footballers at the 2010 Asian Games
Asian Games competitors for Hong Kong
Hong Kong League XI representative players